The Morocco national rugby league team has been participating in international competition since 1995. Many players for the Moroccan team are drawn from the French competition.

Morocco has participated in the World Sevens (1995), Superleague World Nines (1996), Emerging Nations Tournament (1995, 2000) and Mediterranean Cup (since 2003) competitions. In 2009 Morocco won the RLEF Euro Med Challenge.

Current squad
Squad for 2019 MEA Rugby League Championship:
Souhail Ait Alla
Ahmed El Faiz
Brahim Aferhane
Ouhcham Mahdi
Mohssin Afouks
Ismail Edhouz
Mbark Hani
Yassin Oujbor
Marouane Mounwir
Chnikhl Youssef
Ilias El Fezazi
Iliass Laachiri
Oussama El Abdioui
Amine Belaachj
Aissa El Hamdaoui
Soufiane Kissi
Ali Sambo
Bilal Zariouh
Naji Anas
Ismail Edhouz
Yassin Oujbor
Badreddine Medkouri
Adam Ed Diche

Results
 Morocco def. Cameroon 8-4 (2 October 2019)
 Lebanon def. Morocco 26–24 (12 October 2012)
 Lebanon def. Morocco 72–4 (28 June 2011)
 Morocco def. Belgium 46–12 (15 August 2009)
 Morocco def. Catalonia 29–6 (4 July 2009)
 Morocco def. Italy 32–10 (6 June 2009)
 Morocco def. Catalonia 62–12 (21 June 2008)
 Morocco drew with Serbia 20–20 (9 October 2004)
 Lebanon def. Morocco 48–14 (5 October 2004)
 France def. Morocco 46–6 (2 October 2004)
 Morocco def. Serbia 58–4 (25 October 2003)
 Lebanon def. Morocco 60–0 (22 October 2003)
 France def. Morocco 72–0 (19 October 2003)
 Morocco def. Japan 14–8 (15 November 2000)
 USA def. Morocco 50–10 (2000)
 France def. Morocco 80–8 (11 November 1999)
 Lebanon def. Morocco 104–0 (1999)
 Italy def. Morocco 34–0 (1999)
 Ireland def. Morocco 42–6 (20 October 1995)
 Moldova def. Morocco 24–19 (18 October 1995)

All-Time Results

See also

Rugby league in Morocco
Fédération Marocaine de Rugby League
Rugby league in Africa

References

External links

National rugby league teams
National sports teams of Morocco
Rugby league in Africa